Country Sunshine is a studio album by American country music artist Dottie West. It was released in November 1973 on RCA Victor Records. The album's ten tracks were produced by Billy Davis. Her 21st studio recording, Country Sunshine was released following the success of the title track. The song became a major hit after first being part of a Coca-Cola commercial. The album itself would reach major positions on national publication charts following its release.

Background and content
The creation of Country Sunshine was derived from the success of the title track. The song was written by West and the album's producer (Billy Davis). The pair had been collaborating musically for several years after West had been signed to write commercial jingles for the Coca-Cola soda company. When the title track became a hit, West went into the recording studio to make an album around it. It was West's first production assignment with Davis. The sessions were produced in July 1973 at the RCA Studio in Nashville, Tennessee. The collection consisted of ten tracks. The album included several new tracks, including "My Mind's Gone to Memphis" which was written by Larry Gatlin. Another new track was "The Lady", was co-written by West and Red Lane. The project also featured cover versions of several songs. Among the cover songs was Paul McCartney's "My Love", the Eagles' "Desperado" and "Jesse" by Janis Ian.

Release and reception

Country Sunshine was released in November 1973 on RCA Victor Records, becoming her 21st studio album issued in her career. It was issued as a vinyl LP, containing five songs on each side of the record. Country Sunshine peaked at number 17 on the Billboard Top Country Albums chart in February 1974, after spending 17 weeks on the list. It was West's highest-charting album since 1968. Billboard Magazine reviewed Country Sunshine in November 1973, giving it a warm reception. Writers especially praised West's cover of "My Love" and the original composition, "It's Been a Long Time Since Atlanta". They also praised the album's sound and style. "Dottie comes on with a smoothness which lasts throughout the album. Almost all ballads, it's Dottie at her best, including her hit single," staff writers commented.

The title track had been released as a single in 1973. It was first issued as a single in August 1973. By November, the song had peaked at number two on the Billboard Hot Country Singles chart. The song also became her second single to cross over to the Billboard Hot 100, where it reached a peak position of 49. It became West's first major hit since 1970 following its success. On the Canadian RPM Country Singles chart, the title track also became a major hit, peaking at number nine.

Track listing

Personnel
All credits are adapted from the liner notes of Country Sunshine.

Musical personnel
 David Briggs – piano
 Marie F. Cain – backing vocals
 Larry Londin – drums
 Weldon Myrick – steel guitar
 The Nashville Edition – backing vocals
 Hargus "Pig" Robbins – piano
 Dale Sellers – guitar
 Jerry Shook – guitar
 Buddy Spicher – fiddle
 Bobby Thompson – banjo
 Chip Young – guitar
 Steve Wariner – bass
 Dottie West – lead vocals

Technical personnel
 Coca-Cola – cover photo
 Billy Davis – producer
 Acy Lehman – cover photo
 Al Puchucki – engineering
 David Roys – recording technician
 Mike Shockley – recording technician
 Bill Vandevort – engineering

Chart performance

Release history

References

1973 albums
Dottie West albums
RCA Records albums